Fagan or Phagan is also a Norman-Irish surname, derived from the Latin word 'paganus' meaning ‘rural’ or ‘rustic’. Variants of the name Fagan include Fegan and Fagen. It was brought to Ireland during the Anglo-Norman invasion in the twelfth century and is now considered very Irish. In some cases it is a reduced Anglicized form of Gaelic Ó Fágáin or Ó Faodhagáin, which are probably dialect forms of Ó hÓgáin (see Hogan, Hagan) and Ó hAodhagáin (see Hagan). Irish lenited f (spelled fh) is soundless. Notable people with the surname include: 

 Alex Fagan (1950–2010), former chief of the San Francisco Police Department
 Andrew Fagan (born 1962), New Zealand singer, writer and songwriter
 Ann Fagan Ginger (born 1925), lawyer, teacher, writer, and political activist
 Audrey Fagan (1962–2007), former Australian Capital Territory Chief Police Officer
 Brian Fagan (born 1936), archaeologist and anthropologist
 Carson Fagan (born 1982), Caymanian international football player 
 Chris Fagan (born 1961), Australian football coach
 Cliff Fagan (1911–1995), president of the Basketball Hall of Fame
 Clint Fagan (born 1981), American baseball umpire
 Craig Fagan (1982), English footballer
 Cyril Fagan (1896–1970), Irish astrologer
 David Fagan (1961), New Zealand champion sheep shearer
 Ed Fagan (born 1952), American former lawyer
 Eleanora Fagan (1915–1959), better known as Billie Holiday, American jazz singer
 Garth Fagan (born 1940), Jamaican modern dance choreographer
 Gerald Fagan (born 1939), Canadian conductor
 Ina Fagan (1893–1985), birth name of American actress Ina Claire
 James Fagan (MP) (1800–1869), Irish Repeal Association politician and timber merchant
 James Fagan (musician) (born 1972), folk musician from Sydney, Australia
 James Fleming Fagan (1828–1893), Confederate major general in the American Civil War
 James H. Fagan (born 1947), American politician
 J. B. Fagan (1873–1933), Irish-born actor, theatre manager, producer and playwright in England
 Jim Fagan (1882–1948), Australian rules footballer
 Jeffrey Fagan (born 1946), professor at Columbia Law School
 Joe Fagan (1921–2001), manager of Liverpool F.C.
 Joseph Fagan (1941–2013), American psychologist
 Jermaine Fagan, Jamaican reggae artist
 Kevin Fagan (cartoonist) (born 1956), American cartoonist, creator of the syndicated comic strip Drabble
 Kevin Fagan (doctor) (1909–1992), Australian doctor and World War II hero
 Kevin Fagan (American football) (born 1963), former defensive end for the San Francisco 49ers
 Laurie Fagan, Australian rugby league footballer
 Louise Fagan, Canadian director and producer 
 Mark M. Fagan (1869–1955), former mayor of Jersey City, New Jersey
 Mary Fagan (born 1939), former Lord Lieutenant of Hampshire
 Michael Fagan, a software designer credited with inventing the Fagan inspection process for formal software inspections
 Michael Fagan (intruder) (born 1948), Buckingham Palace intruder
 Mike Fagan (born 1980), American bowler
 Myron Coureval Fagan (1887–1972), American playwright, editor, producer and cinematographer
 Oisin Fagan (born 1973), Irish boxer, former WBO Middleweight title holder 
 Patsy Fagan (born 1951), Irish snooker player
 Roy Fagan (1905–1990), Australian politician and deputy premier of Tasmania
 Shaun Fagan (born 1984), Scottish association footballer

See also
 Fagen, surname
 Fagin (surname)
 Mary Phagan, 13-year-old factory girl murdered in 1913, allegedly by Leo Frank